Frank John Mahoney Jr. (October 25, 1901 – November 21, 1961) was an American football back who played five seasons with the Chicago Cardinals of the National Football League. He played college football at Creighton University and attended the Omaha High School of Commerce in Omaha, Nebraska. He was a member of the Chicago Cardinals team that were NFL champions in 1925. He also played baseball, basketball and participated in track and field. Mahoney played for the Chicago Bruins of the American Basketball League. He had received an offer to play baseball for the Pittsburgh Pirates but opted to play football for the Chicago Cardinals.

References

External links
Just Sports Stats
Fanbase profile

1901 births
1961 deaths
Players of American football from Nebraska
American football running backs
American men's basketball players
Creighton Bluejays football players
Chicago Cardinals players
Chicago Bruins players
Sportspeople from Omaha, Nebraska